Emil Aslan (born 19 November 1978 in Yerevan) is a Czech political scientist and university lecturer, since 2018 research director at the Institute of International Relations in Prague.

Biography and career 
Emil Aslan was born in Yerevan. He graduated from Moscow State Pedagogical University (1997, B.A. in studies of German language), Charles University (1999, B.A. equivalent in German Studies and Russian Studies; 2001, M.A. in International Relations: Institute of Political Studies; 2005, Ph.D. in International Relations), Peter the Great St. Petersburg Polytechnic University (2004, LL.M.). He was Fulbright Visiting scholar at Harvard University. In 2020, Aslan became a Full Professor.

Since 2004 he lectures at the Charles University; currently an associate professor at the Department of Security Studies, Institute of Political Studies, Faculty of Social Sciences. Additionally. In 2018 he took the post of research director at Institute of International Relations Prague. He has provided dozens of analyses to the Czech Ministries of Foreign Affairs and Defence, as well as the NATO. His analyses have frequently appeared in CACI Analyst. He is a frequent columnist and media commentator, authoring ca 150 articles in such media as Hospodářské noviny, Mladá fronta DNES, Lidové noviny.

His area of expertise of interests consist of: security and asymmetric conflict (civil war and ethnic conflict; small wars; insurgency and counter-insurgency, radicalization), especially in Central Asia and Caucasus; particularly the ethnography/micro-dynamics of political violence, with emphasis on asymmetric warfare; politics of memory; qualitative methods.

He speaks Russian, Czech, Armenian, English, German, Slovak, Turkish, Azerbaijani and has passive knowledge of Crimean Tatar, French, Italian.

Beside scientific work, Aslan paints and writes poetry as well. In 1997, he was junior superheavyweight boxing champion of the South Moscow District.

Works 
Emil Aslan wrote 6 monographs, 12 book chapters and encyclopaedic entries, 39 articles in journals with impact factor, 19 peer-reviewed articles, 80 analytical articles.

Monographs

References 

1978 births
Charles University alumni
Academic staff of Charles University
Czech people of Armenian descent
Czech political scientists
Living people
Moscow State Pedagogical University alumni
Writers from Yerevan
Fulbright alumni